Class of 1999 II: The Substitute is a 1994 direct-to-video film about a new teacher at a troubled inner city school, where the students are all involved in gangs, drugs, and violence. It was directed by stunt expert Spiro Razatos, and stars Sasha Mitchell as renegade teacher John Bolen.

The movie is the third in series that began with Class of 1984 and continued with Class of 1999. The plots of the three films are only loosely related to each other; Class of 1999 II does contain some flashback sequences that use footage from Class of 1999. "Monroeville" is a George Romero tribute, it being the shopping mall that Dawn Of The Dead (1978) was filmed in Monroeville, Pennsylvania.

Plot
John Bolen is the new substitute teacher at a local high school in Bend, Oregon. When he sees some punks ditching class, he confronts them. When the lead punk pulls a knife, John uses martial arts to dispatch the students and when a fellow teacher sees the downed punks, John informs the teacher that the punks were on their way to class. Afterwards, the principal threatens to have John fired for his actions that morning, but John kills him by breaking his neck. At the same time, the punks wait in their car until school is over to confront John. John gets the upper hand by chaining the doors so they cannot escape and throws a grenade in the car, causing it to explode. Afterwards, John is in his car, eating his dinner, when he sees an advertisement for a military museum in Monroeville, California. Meanwhile, in Monroeville, Jenna McKenzie is a teacher who is getting heat from the school administration because she had witnessed gang leader Sanders pull a gun on a student. Sanders uses all sorts of tactics to harass Jenna into not testifying against him in court. However, Jenna's boyfriend, Emmett Grazer, tends to be there to chase Sanders away much to the chagrin of Jenna, who feels she doesn't need the protection 24-7.

When John arrives to teach his class, he finds trouble in the form of student Tiller, a local troublemaker. When a fellow student drops a book, John hits the floor and begins to hear gunfire in his head. He finds the book to be Tiller's and sends him to the principal's office. Tiller goes to the roof of the school to take a hit of the drug "edge" when John shows up and throws Tiller off the roof. Tiller attempts to hang onto the flagpole, but his hands slip and is hung from the flagpole dead. The next day, Jenna goes out for a jog when she finds Sanders and some of his goons begin to once again harass her. When Sanders leaves his boys to attack Jenna, John shows up in time to save her. Jenna and John soon bond and while sheriff Tom Yost is taking Jenna's report, he notices John sporting a tattoo for Special Forces. When Tom asks John about a military background, John walks away.

Emmett is in charge of a small military museum, which was advertised in the same magazine John was reading earlier, and as a military expert, he is planning a friendly paintball competition between the students. John begins to show interest in some of Emmett's military gear but is still hesitant of revealing who he really is. Meanwhile, a mysterious man named G.D. Ash is reporting on the incidents that occurred in Kennedy High School two years ago involving android instructors malfunctioning and killing the students. John and Jenna continue their friendship with John teaching Jenna a bit about military tactics and quotes. To make sure Jenna is safe, John hunts down a member of Sanders' gang and at first, use martial arts before chaining him to a wall and setting him on fire. On the day of the paintball competition, John wages war on everyone involved and even targets Emmett and Jenna. He kills some troublemaking students and when Jenna is once again confronted by Sanders, this causes John to arrive again but this time seal the deal and kill Sanders and the rest of his gang.

When Jenna confronts John, John finally reveals he is a military android. When G.D. Ash. arrives, he uncovers something interesting about John. John is not an android, but rather the son of Dr. Bob Forrest, the creator of the android teachers who killed the students at Kennedy High two years ago. John had served in the Special Forces and has suffered from post traumatic stress disorder to the point where he actually believes that he is an android. Instead, John is actually sporting a new brand of body armor, making him impervious to bullets and even blades. Ash is then killed by John. When John and Jenna end up in Emmett's military bunker, John intends to kill both himself and Jenna by planting a bomb in the bunker. However, Emmett makes the save and he and Jenna escape, but John arrives and shoots Emmett. Jenna shoots John in the head causing him to fall back into the bunker and die. Jenna covers Emmett and declares her love for him as the bunker explodes.

Two days later, Jenna is preparing for school and as she is on the phone with Emmett, opens her shirt to reveal she is wearing body armor, thanks to Emmett having a copy of the armor in his museum. Jenna repeats a line John once uttered about preparing for battle as she prepares to begin her day.

Production
The film had a working title of Class of 2001: The Substitute, and retained that name for its French release. Accordingly, the character of G.D. Ash refers to the events of Class of 1999 as having occurred two years previously.

Cast
 Sasha Mitchell as John Bolen
 Caitlin Dulany as Jenna McKenzie
 Nick Cassavetes as Emmett Grazer
 Gregory West as Sanders
 Rick Hill as G.D. Ash
 Jack Knight as Sheriff Tom Yost
 Diego Serrano as Ice
 Berny Pock as Dennis Tiller
 Denney Pierce as punk leader
 Loring Pickering as high school principal
 John Cathran Jr. as Monroe H.S. principal
 Pete Antico as dumb kid
 Christopher Brown as "D"
 Eric Stabenau as Ray Buchanan
 Jean St. James as Ms. Buchanan
 Renie Millea as teacher
 Ken Phillips as the substitute
 Doc D. Charbonneau as punk
 Phil Culotta as punk
 Chris Durand as punk
 Andy Gill as youth

Home media
Vidmark Entertainment released the film on videocassette in March 1994. It has not been released on DVD in Region 1, though there has been a Region 2 release. As of March 2022, the movie is available for rental or purchase on Amazon Prime Video.

References

External links
 

1994 direct-to-video films
1994 films
1994 action thriller films
1990s science fiction horror films
1990s science fiction action films
American dystopian films
American independent films
American action thriller films
American high school films
American robot films
American science fiction horror films
American science fiction action films
American sequel films
Films about educators
Films about school violence
Films set in the 1990s
Films set in the future
CineTel Films films
Direct-to-video horror films
Direct-to-video science fiction films
Direct-to-video sequel films
1990s English-language films
1990s American films